Buraas is a surname. Notable people with the surname include:

Anders Buraas (1915–2010), Norwegian journalist and author
Hans Petter Buraas (born 1975), Norwegian skier
Sindre Buraas (born 1989), Norwegian runner
 

Norwegian-language surnames